The Kosten unit (Ke) is a commonly used aggregate measure for aircraft noise in the Netherlands, developed by the Kosten Committee 1963. A yearly average which represents outdoor noise levels.

References

 Adviescommissie Geluidhinder door Vliegtuigen, 1967. Adviescommissie Geluidhinder door Vliegtuigen, Geluidhinder door vliegtuigen., TNO, Delft (1967).
 Review of  statutory Limits in the Netherlands
 Analysis in noise policy Inter-noise 2001 - The Hague, Netherlands, 29 August 2001

See also
Dutch units of measurement

Sound
Systems of units